Lilia Oleksandrivna Podkopayeva (born August 15, 1978) is a Ukrainian former artistic gymnast. She is the 1995 world all-around champion, and the 1996 Olympic all-around and floor exercise champion. Often thought of as a complete athlete, Podkopayeva was known for combining power, style, and balletic grace.

Gymnastics career

1993–95 
In March 1993, Lilia won her only National All Around Title in Ukraine. In April 1993, Podkopayeva competed at the World Artistic Gymnastics Championships in Birmingham, England. She qualified for the vault final, but crashed on her first attempt and finished last with a score of 8.893.

At the 1994 World Championships in Brisbane, Australia, she placed sixth in the all-around with a score of 38.942. In event finals, she placed eighth on vault, scoring 9.424; fifth on uneven bars, scoring 9.350; and second on balance beam, scoring 9.737. In November 1994, at the World Team Championships in Dortmund, Germany, she contributed an all-around score of 38.099 toward the Ukrainian team's fifth-place finish.

The following year, Podkopayeva competed at the 1995 World Championships in Sabae, Japan. She helped Ukraine place fifth and qualify a full team to the 1996 Olympics. Podkopayeva then won the all-around final with a score of 39.248. In event finals, she placed first on vault (9.781), second on uneven bars (9.837), second on balance beam (9.837), and seventh on floor (9.087).

1996 
At the beginning of the year, Podkopayeva was seriously injured when she fell from the beam in practice, fracturing two ribs. However, in May, she competed at the European Championships in Birmingham, where she helped the Ukrainian team place third and won the individual all-around with a score of 39.205. In event finals, she placed third on balance beam (9.756), first on uneven bars (9.825), and first on floor (9.862).

Atlanta Olympics 
In July, Podkopayeva competed at the 1996 Summer Olympics in Atlanta, Georgia. In the team final, she contributed a combined compulsory and optional score of 78.061 toward the Ukrainian team's fifth-place finish. She then won the all-around final with a score of 39.255. In event finals, she placed fifth on uneven bars (9.787), second on balance beam (9.825), and first on floor (9.887). She was the fourth gymnast to win the Olympic all-around title as the reigning world champion, and the first gymnast to win the all-around without winning a team medal. She was also the last female gymnast to win the all-around title and an event-final gold medal until Simone Biles did this in 2016.

1997 
Podkopayeva originally intended to continue competing after the 1996 Olympics, and she was named to the Ukrainian team for the 1997 World Championships. However, injuries forced her to sit out the competition and, later, to retire.

Eponymous skills
Podkopayeva has two eponymous skills listed in the Code of Points.

Post-retirement 
In 2002, Podkopayeva started the Golden Lilia International Sports Festival, an exhibition featuring artistic and rhythmic gymnasts, acrobats, and dancers. She said, "It's important to us to show outstanding people and brightest talent so that the next generation can follow the best of the best."

In December 2004, she married a Ukrainian businessman Tymofiy Nahornyi. They have two children: Vadym, adopted in Ukraine in July 2006, and Karolina, born in November 2006. The couple divorced in 2009.

In 2005, Podkopayeva became a United Nations goodwill ambassador on HIV/AIDS in Ukraine. She is also an Ambassador of the Council of Europe for Sport, Tolerance, and Fair Play.

In 2007, she won Ukraine's Dancing With the Stars with partner Sergiy Kostetskyi. The next year, she represented Ukraine in the Eurovision Dance Contest. Along with partner Kyrylo Khytrov, she placed third in the competition.

In 2014, Podkopayeva did a gala event in Mexico, using similar choreography to the floor routine she performed in Atlanta, as well as doing back handsprings and round-offs.

In 2019, Podkopayeva joined the coaching staff at Marcus Jewish Community Center of Atlanta's Perimeter Gymnastics.

See also

List of Olympic female gymnasts for Ukraine

References

External links

 

1978 births
Living people
Sportspeople from Donetsk
Serhiy Bubka College of Olympic Reserve alumni
Ukrainian female artistic gymnasts
Gymnasts at the 1996 Summer Olympics
Olympic gold medalists for Ukraine
Olympic silver medalists for Ukraine
Olympic medalists in gymnastics
World champion gymnasts
Medalists at the World Artistic Gymnastics Championships
Originators of elements in artistic gymnastics
Recipients of the Order of Princess Olga
Recipients of the Order of Merit (Ukraine), 2nd class
Olympic gymnasts of Ukraine
Medalists at the 1996 Summer Olympics
Goodwill Games medalists in gymnastics
Competitors at the 1994 Goodwill Games
European champions in gymnastics
Recipients of the Honorary Diploma of the Cabinet of Ministers of Ukraine